Cadlina tasmanica is a species of sea slug or dorid nudibranch, a marine gastropod mollusk in the family Cadlinidae.

Distribution

Description

Ecology

References

Cadlinidae
Gastropods described in 1990